Zbigniew Jan Romaszewski (2 January 1940 – 13 February 2014) was a Polish conservative politician, senator since 1989, and human rights activist.

After the June 1976 protests he was cofounder of assurance to workers prosecuted by communist regime. He was one of the founders of the Workers' Defence Committee (KOR). He became Chief of Bureau of Intervention of the Committee for Social Self-defence KOR in 1977. 
In 1979 knew  Andrej Sacharov. In 1980 he was the founder of the Helsinki Committee in Poland. In 1980-1981 he was chief of Commission of Intervention and Law-abidingness of Solidarity. During martial law in Poland he established independent Radio Solidarity. In 1982 he was arrested and jailed by the Communist regime until 1984.

In 2007 he was elected to the Senate from the electoral list of Law and Justice. From 28 November 2007 he was deputy marshal of Polish Senate.

He died at age 74 in a hospital in Warsaw, after a week of induced coma.

References

External links

 Official web site of Zbigniew Romaszewski
 Zbigniew Romaszewski Freedom Collection interview

1940 births
2014 deaths
Members of the Committee for Social Self-Defense KOR
Members of the Workers' Defence Committee
Politicians from Warsaw
Solidarity (Polish trade union) activists
Law and Justice politicians
Movement for Reconstruction of Poland politicians
Members of the Senate of Poland 1989–1991
Members of the Senate of Poland 1991–1993
Members of the Senate of Poland 1993–1997
Members of the Senate of Poland 1997–2001
Members of the Senate of Poland 2001–2005
Members of the Senate of Poland 2005–2007
University of Warsaw alumni
Recipients of the Order of the White Eagle (Poland)